The 3rd CurtisTrophy was a motor race, run to Formula One rules, held on 29 May 1955 at Snetterton Circuit, Norfolk. The race was run over 10 laps, and was won by British driver Roy Salvadori in a Maserati 250F. Salvadori also set fastest lap and started from pole position.

Results

References 

Curtis Trophy